It Takes All Kinds of People may refer to:

 song by Meatloaf from the 1971 album Stoney & Meatloaf
 song from the 1972 album Roy Orbison Sings
 song from the 1975 album Who I Am (David Ruffin album)

See also
 It Takes All Kinds (disambiguation)